Shatilov is a Russian masculine surname, its feminine counterpart is Shatilova. It may refer to
Alexander Shatilov (born 1987), Israeli artistic gymnast
Anna Shatilova (born 1938), Russian TV announcer and presenter
Vasily Shatilov (1902–1995), Soviet general

Russian-language surnames